Yitzhak Yedid is an Israeli-Australian contemporary classical music composer and improvising pianist, the recipient of numerous awards.

Biography
Yitzhak Yedid was born in Jerusalem, Israel to a sephardic Jewish family of Syrian and Iraqi descent. His initial formative musical experiences included attending liturgical services at his local synagogue where he imbibed the sounds and rhythms of Syrian-style Baqashot. He studied at the Rubin Academy of Music and the New England Conservatory in Boston with Ran Blake and Paul Bley in 1997 and 1998. Yedid lives in Australia. In 2012 he gained a PhD from Monash University in Melbourne and subsequently published Methods of Integrating Elements of Arabic Music and Arabic-Influenced Jewish Music into Contemporary Western Classical Music.

Career

In 1999 Yedid released his first album, Compositions for Solo Piano, for the Musa label. This led to an invitation to perform in Scandinavia as the guest of the pianist Michael Smith, and to a joint recital in Sweden with the pianist Roland Pontinen. In 2001, Yedid's second recording, Inner Outcry, was released, also for Musa. Yedid was commissioned to compose the suite Tachanun for the opening of "The Third Stream" festival in Vienna, Austria, in 2002. This composition has been performed many times in Israel including at the Kfar Blum Chamber Music Festival.

Myth of the Cave was commissioned by German record label Between the Lines. It was released in 2002. The five-movement piece has been performed at festivals in Germany and Austria, at the Vancouver International Jazz Festival in Canada and at the Tel Aviv Jazz Festival in Israel. It is based on Plato's allegory of the cave, about cave dwellers imprisoned in near-darkness since birth whose sense of reality is distorted. One of them escapes to the outside world, reports on what he has seen and is put to death for his revelations.

In 2003 Yedid composed Passions and Prayers – Sextet in homage to Jerusalem for Between the Lines. It is a technically complex and conceptually melancholy composition that premiered at the 2004 Israel Festival. The CD was released in August 2005.

Reflections upon Six Images was commissioned for the Third Stream Festival in Vienna Austria in 2004. The music depicts the union and division of images, colours, textures, styles and cultures inspired by the world of the imagination. The composition was performed at the Vienna festival in September 2004 and at the Etnakhta concert series in November 2004 in Israel. The CD was released at the end of 2005.

In 2005, Yedid composed the Oud Bass Piano Trio, performed at the Sibiu Festival in Romania, as well as in Australia, Canada, and the US in May and September 2005. In 2002, he joined Israeli jazz saxophonist Abatte Barihun to form the duo Ras Deshen. They recorded their maiden album in September 2002, which featured a blend of Ethiopian music and Free improvisation jazz.

Since immigrating to Australia in 2007, his large scale works include: seven string quartets (Visions, Fantasies & Dances), commissioned by Israel's Sapphire String Quartet; Piano Concerto (2016), commissioned by Michael Kieran Harvey and the Tel Aviv Soloists; Kiddushim & Killulim (2017) commissioned by Christian Lindberg & NK Orchestra; Delusions of War (2014) for 22 string soloists or string orchestra, commissioned by Divertimenti Ensemble and the Jerusalem Symphony Orchestra; Mandolin Concerto (2016), for mandolin and a large orchestra.

Yedid's chamber and solo works include: Chad Gadya (2017), quartet for clarinet, violin, cello & piano, commissioned by Stradbroke Chamber Music Festival; Sensations (2010) for piano, violin and cello, commissioned by Atar Trio; Angles' Revolt (2017) chaconne for solo piano, commissioned by Lev Vlassenko Piano Competition; Out to Infinity (2009) for Harp solo, commissioned by the 2009 International Harp Contest for their 50th Anniversary; The Crying Souls, Lament for Syrian Victims (2013), a cappella choir, commissioned by the Australian Voices (TAV)

Yedid has put out over ten albums as a solo act (Challenge Records International, Sony, Naxos, -btl-, Muse, MCI, and Kaleidos) and has collaborated Ethiopian-born saxophonist and vocalist Abate Berihun as the Ras-Deshen ensemble.

Yedid's works for strings include 'Visions, Fantasies and Dances' for string quartet (2006–09) and 'Delusions of War' for string orchestra (2014), and his compositions 'Oud Bass Piano Trio' (2006) and 'Arabic Violin Bass Piano Trio' (2008) combine a classical Arabic instrument with Western instruments.

Some of Yedid's works have been described as Third Stream, which combines contemporary classical music with jazz improvisation. Much of Yedid's output includes slots where soloists can improvise. Yedid has often said he is delighted when performers surprise him with their inventiveness.

Musical style and influences
Yedid says his music is influenced by Arabic music. "When I was a child I went to the Syrian synagogue, where you hear all the melodies in the Arabic scales. I'm using microtonals in my compositions, and also using the Hassidic and Orthodox Jewish scales. This is all with free jazz and classical music, in equal parts."

Yedid's music contains a mix of elements. He says: "I'm dealing with very classical things, also with jazz and folk things—but it's not classical and it's not jazz and it's not folk. I'm using various techniques, like a painter who's trying to use all the materials he knows about. I'm trying to bring all these different elements together. My music is like a story – it's like a film or a play."

Yedid writes "In Israel, I grew up acutely aware of the tensions caused by the animosity between Palestinians and Israelis. Of profound significance were the sensory images of the shocking terror attack that occurred in a mall in central Jerusalem on December 3, 2001. The destruction and suffering caused by the two suicide bombers was devastating and continues to haunt me to this day. This attack killed eleven innocent boys including my relative 19-year-old Moshe Yedid-Levy. However, in my music, my intention is not to refer directly to experiences such as this but rather to look at Arabic and Jewish matters from a human perspective and in conjunction with philosophical and religious concerns. I am a strong believer in the power of music to bring about understanding, change and reform in societies, and perhaps also between nations. It is my wish to convey the idea of cultural pluralism."

Yedid's style of composition has been described as "eclectic, multicultural and very personal- a style that combines jazz and Jewish cantor music, classic European and avant-garde, randomness and a blend of techniques." Barry Davis wrote in the Jerusalem Post (2017), "Over the past couple of decades or so, Yedid has put out an almost bewilderingly eclectic range of works and recordings. His disciplinary backdrop takes in Western classical music, jazz, free improvisation, Arabic music and liturgical material. His compositions are generally viscerally and cerebrally engaging, and often visually striking, with the piano- playing role requiring a certain amount of calisthenic activity and a significant dosage of emotional and technical investment."
Yedid writes "Looking for new compositional approaches and challenging musical conventions through the synthesis of a wide spectrum of contemporary and ancient styles is what motivated my work. Intellectual conflicts such as the confrontation with philosophical matters and religious and political aspects have always been of interest, and also underlie and motivated my work. I have been influenced in particular by Béla Bartók and Arnold Schoenberg to develop a personal vision as a composer." This words by Yedid are inline with what the critics write about his music: John Shand from the Sydney Morning Herald wrote in 2014 about Yedid's Myth of the Cave "a vividly expansive composition"; Noam Ben-Zeav (Haaretz) wrote in 2013 that "Yedid music is an authentic expression of new music which incorporates a wide spectrum of contemporary and ancient styles"; and Ake Holmquist (NorraSkåne, Sweden) wrote in 2004 that "Yedid integrates specific stylistic influences into a personal created unity. The manner in which he describes folkloristic influences and melancholic specific themes can remind of Béla Bartók; improvisatory float of hovering à la Keith Jarrett".

Musically, Yedid creates a confluence between the Maqamat (Arabic music modal system), heterophonic textures of ancient genres, and compositional approaches of contemporary Western classical music, to produce an original sound. Yedid introduces microtonality in his works in a range of different ways. He examined ways of using microtonal pitches that in Arabic music function as ornamentation and as part of improvisational gestures. He has extended the use of traditional ornamentation to compose microtonal sounds with microtonal qualities that unfold at different tempi without a definite pitch. This can be seen in many of his works. In his string quartet Visions, Fantasies and Dances, the microtonal intervals function in the context of diatonic and chromatic intervals and the method of a tension-and-release for intervals of a quarter-tone and three-quarter-tones have been employed.

Yedid have shown a new direction in his later works and courage to make a commentary on international currant political/religious problems that continue to find no resolution. The Crying Souls (commissioned by the Australian Voices) and Delusions of War (commissioned by the Jerusalem Symphony Orchestra) are both anti-war works. The Crying Souls was written as a response to the chemical weapons attacks that happened in August 2013 in Damascus when more than 1,300 innocent civilian including children were massacred. Yedid writes "This work expresses my endless sadness to the death of innocent people". In the notes on Delusions of War he writes "The music aims to make the listeners "feel" the human suffering that the war causes, and, without assuming to have answers, to encourage them to pause for a moment and to envisage better ways than force to resolve crises. The music captures emotions of anger and fear, and feelings of sorrow, tragedy and righteousness."

Awards and honours
Yedid was the winner of the 2020 Azrieli Foundation Prize for Jewish Music. His winning composition, Kiddushim Ve’ Killulim (Blessings and Curses), was unanimously declared the best new major work of Jewish music by the judges of the Canadian prize.

In 2018 Yedid was awarded the Sidney Myer Creative Fellowship, worth  over a two-year period.

Yedid awarded the top two prizes in Israel for composers and performers: the Prime Minister's Prize for Composers (2007) and the Landau Prize for Performing Arts (2009). In 2008 he was awarded the first composition prize for Out to Infinity, a solo work for harp, at the 17th International Harp contest which led to numerous performances and recordings of the piece worldwide. Yedid has been awarded a composer-in- residence position at the Judith Wright Arts Centre (Brisbane, 2010), at the Western Australian Academy of Performing Arts (2008) and at the Gallop House in WA (2021, National Trust of Australia).

Awards include:
 ACUM Prize, 2016
 Australia Council for the Arts composition grants  
 ACUM Prize, 2013
 Artist-in-Residence (2010), Judith Wright Centre of Contemporary Arts
 Australian Postgraduate Award (2009–12), Australian Government
 Landau Prize for Performing Arts (2009), Michael Landau Foundation, Tel Aviv, Israel
 First prize for a work for harp solo ("Out of Infinity") (2008), Israel's International Harp Contest, 50th Anniversary
 Prime Minister Award for Composers (2007), Ministry of Culture and Education, Jerusalem, Israel
 The Jerusalem International Oud Festival Prize (2006), Center for Ethnic Music and Poetry, The Kalman Sultanik Confederation

Compositions

Before 2005
 Remembering Yitzhak Rabin (2004) for piano solo (ca. 15')
Commissioned by Musa Records 1999
CD released in 1999 by Musa records
Yitzhak Yedid – piano

 Caravan for orchestra and jazz ensemble (ca. 17')
The Rubin Academy

 Tachanun (2004), Suite in one movement for piano, double bass and percussions (ca. 66')
Commissioned by Vienna music Gallery Festival, Austria
Duration: 66 minutes
Premiere Performance: September 2005, Vienna Music Gallery Festival
Yedid Ensemble (Vlad Nedelin – drums & percussions, Ora Boasson Horev – double bass, Yitzhak Yedid – piano)

2005–2018
 Myth of the Cave (2005) for clarinet/bass clarinet, double bass and piano (ca. 56')
Commissioned by Deutsche Structured Finance GmbH, Germany
CD released by Between The Lines
Premiere: May 2005, Frankfurt, Germany
Yedid Ensemble (François Houle – clarinet & bass clarinet; Ora Boasson-Horev – double bass; Yitzhak Yedid – piano)

 Tachanun (2005), Suite in one movement for piano solo (ca. 50')
Commissioned by Vienna Music Gallery Festival, Vienna, Austria
Premiere: Chamber Music Festival, Israel
Yitzhak Yedid – piano

 Full Moon Fantasy (2005) for piano solo (ca. 37')
Commissioned by Musa Records 2001
CD released in 1999 by Musa records; reissued in 2005
Yitzhak Yedid – piano

 Oud, Bass, Piano Trio (2006), Parts 3 (ca. 11')
Commissioned by the Oud International Festival
CD released by Challenge International Records and Between The Lines in August 2007
Premiere: 2006, Vancouver Festival
Yedid Ensemble (Michael Maroun – oud; Ora Boasson-Horev – double bass; Yitzhak Yedid – piano)

 Reflections upon Six Images (2006), Image 1, for clarinet, viola, double bass and piano (ca. 13')
Commissioned by Vienna Music Gallery Festival, Vienna, Austria
CD released by Between The Lines
Premiere: Vienna Music Gallery Festival
Yedid Ensemble (François Houle – clarinet & bass clarinet; Galia Hai – viola; Ora Boasson-Horev – double bass; Yitzhak Yedid – piano)

 Oud, Bass, Piano Trio (2006), Parts 1–2 (ca. 21')
Commissioned by the Oud International Festival
CD released by Challenge International Records and Between The Lines in August 2007
Premiere: May 2005, Sibiu Festival, Romania
Yedid Ensemble (Michael Maroun – oud; Ora Boasson-Horev – double bass; Yitzhak Yedid – piano)

 Ras Deshen (2006) for voice, saxophones, krar and piano (ca. 61')
Commissioned by MCI
CD released by MCI records
 Premiere: Tel Aviv Arts Festival
Ras Deshen Ensemble (Abatte Barihun – voice and saxophones; Fentahon Malessa – krar; Yitzhak Yedid – piano)

 Nine Images (2007) for violin, cello and piano (ca. 18')
Commissioned by IBA
Premiere: March 2007, Jerusalem International YMCA, Jerusalem, Israel
Orit Wolf – piano; Nathaniel Vallois – violin; Doo-Min Kim – cello

 Chagall Project (2007), seven piano solo pieces inspired by Marc Chagall (ca. 42')
Commissioned by The Israeli Music Festival
Premiere: September 2007
CD released by Challenge International Records in September 2010
Yitzhak Yedid – piano

 Oud, Bass, Piano Trio (2007), Parts 4–5 (ca. 32')
Commissioned by the Oud International Festival
CD released by Challenge International Records and Between The Lines in August 2007
Premiere: May 2005, Sibiu Festival, Romania
Yedid Ensemble (Michael Maroun – oud; Ora Boasson-Horev – double-bass; Yitzhak Yedid – piano

 Reflections upon Six Images (2007), Images 2–3, for clarinet, viola, double bass and piano (ca. 27')
Commissioned by Vienna Music Gallery Festival, Vienna, Austria
CD released by Between The Lines
Premiere: Vienna Music Gallery Festival, Austria
Yedid Ensemble (François Houle – clarinet & bass-clarinet; Galia Hai – viola; Ora Boasson-Horev – double bass; Yitzhak Yedid – piano)

 Ethiopian voices: Psalms (2008) for three singers, Ethiopian folk dancer, alto, double bass and piano (ca. 51')
Commissioned by the Confederation House
Premiere: November 2008, Confederation House, Jerusalem, Israel
Ras Deshen Ensemble (Abatte Barihun – voice and saxophones; Esti Kenan Ofri – voice; Tzeta Germaye – voice and dance; Fentahon Malessa – krar; Ora Boasson-Horev – double bass; Yitzhak Yedid – piano)

 Clowns at Night (2008) for piano solo (ca. 16')
Commissioned by Deutsche Media Productions GmbH & Co. KG
Premiere: March 2008, Jerusalem International YMCA, Jerusalem, Israel
Yitzhak Yedid, piano

 String Quartet No 1 (2008) (ca. 14')
Commissioned by Deutsche Media Productions GmbH & Co. KG and Between The Lines
Premiere: March 2010, Henry Crown Symphony Hall, Jerusalem, Israel
Sapphire String Quartet (Janna Gandelman – violin; Roman Spitzer – violin; Amos Boasson – viola; Oleg Stolpner – cello)

 Since my Soul Loved (2008) for violin, viola, cello, double bass and piano (ca. 55')
Commissioned by Deutsche Media Productions GmbH & Co. KG and Between The Lines
Premiere: 2009 Lines Festival, Munich, Germany
Yedid Ensemble (Daniel Hoffman – violin; Galia Hai – viola; Yoni Gotlibovich – cello; Ora Boasson-Horev – double-bass; Yitzhak Yedid – piano)

 Midsummer Night's Dream (2008) for piano solo (ca. 21')
Commissioned by Deutsche Media Productions GmbH & Co. KG, 2006
Premiere: March 2008, Jerusalem International YMCA, Jerusalem, Israel
Yitzhak Yedid – piano

Out to Infinity (2008) for harp solo (ca. 7')
Commissioned by Israel's 2009 17th International Harp Contest to celebrate its 50th anniversary, with the kind assistance of the Israel National Lottery Council for the Arts
World premiere: March 2009, American Harp Society National Harp Competition, Young Professional Division
Noël Wan, harp
Israeli premiere: October 2009, Tel Aviv, Israel
Various competing harpists

 In Memory (2009), duo for flute (piccolo and bass) and piano (ca. 13')
Commissioned by Lior Eitan 
Premiere: 21 April 2010, Jerusalem International YMCA, Jerusalem, Israel
Lior Eitan – flute; Monica Fallon – piano

 String Quartet No 3 (2009) (ca. 13')
Commissioned by Sapphire String Quartet
Premiere: March 2010, Henry Crown Symphony Hall, Jerusalem, Israel
Sapphire String Quartet (Janna Gandelman – violin; Roman Spitzer – violin; Amos Boasson – viola; Oleg Stolpner – cello)

 Kidoshin (2009), duo for saxophone (tenor and soprano) and piano (ca. 26')
Commissioned by Shoham Foundation
Premiere: August 2010
Albert Beger – saxophone; Yitzhak Yedid – piano

 String Quartet No 2 (2009) (ca. 9')
Commissioned by Sapphire String Quartet
Premiere: March 2010, Henry Crown Symphony Hall, Jerusalem, Israel
Sapphire String Quartet (Janna Gandelman – violin; Roman Spitzer – violin; Amos Boasson – viola; Oleg Stolpner – cello)

 Sensations (2010) for piano, violin and cello (c. 14')
Commissioned by Atar Trio
Premiere: September 2010, Austria
Atar Trio (Tanya Beltser- violin; Marina Katz- cello; Ofer Shelley – piano)

 Piano Quintet (2010) for violin, viola, cello, double bass and piano (ca. 52')
Commissioned by Jazz Lines München 2011, Munich, Germany
Premiere: March 2011, Allerheiligen-Hofkirche, Jazz Lines München 2011l, Munich, Germany
Yedid Ensemble (Daniel Hoffman – violin; Galia Hai – viola; Yoni Gotlibovich – cello; Ora Boasson-Horev – double-bass; Yitzhak Yedid – piano)

 String Quartet No 4 (2010) (ca. 9')
Commissioned by Sapphire String Quartet
Premiere: November 2012, Jerusalem International YMCA, Jerusalem, Israel
Sapphire String Quartet (Janna Gandelman – violin; Roman Spitzer – violin; Amos Boasson – viola; Oleg Stolpner – cello)

 Through the Window of Marc Chagall (2010) for piano solo (c. 55')
Commissioned by Kawai Piano Series
Premiere: Kawai Piano Series, 2010, Ian Hanger Recital Hall, Queensland Conservatorium Griffith University, Brisbane, Australia
Yitzhak Yedid, piano

 Reflections Upon Six Images (2011), Image no 5 for double bass solo (ca. 7')
Commissioned by Ora Boasson-Horev
Premiere: Vienna, Austria
CD released by Challenge International Records in September 2011

 Arabic Violin Bass Piano Trio (2011) for Arabic violin, double bass and piano, Parts 4–5 (ca. 18')
Commissioned by IBA, Between the Lines and Challenge Records
Premiere: November 2012
Yedid Ensemble (Sami Hashibun – violin (Arabic tuning); Ora Boasson-Horev – double-bass; Yitzhak Yedid – piano)

 String Quartet No 5 (2011) (ca. 11')
Commissioned by Sapphire String Quartet
Premiere: November 2012
Jerusalem International YMCA
Sapphire String Quartet (Janna Gandelman – violin; Roman Spitzer – violin; Amos Boasson – viola,;Oleg Stolpner – cello)

 Passions and Prayers, Sextet in hommage to Jerusalem  (2011) for horn, clarinet/bass clarinet, trombone, viola, double bass and piano (ca. 18')
Commissioned by Deutsche Media Productions GmbH & Co. KG and Between The Lines
CD released by Between The Lines
Premiere: Seattle 2012
Seattle Chamber Players

 Passions & Prayers (2012) for horn, clarinet/bass clarinet, trombone, viola, double bass and piano (ca. 17')
Commissioned by Seattle Chamber Players
Premiere: August 2013, Benaroya Hall, Seattle, USA
Seattle Chamber Players

 String Quartet No 7 (2012) (ca. 11')
Commissioned by Sapphire String Quartet
Premiere: August 2013
Sapphire String Quartet (Janna Gandelman – violin; Roman Spitzer – violin; Amos Boasson – viola; Oleg Stolpner – cello)

 Haunted! (2012), Stage music for a play by Daniel Karasik (ca. 75')
Commissioned by Touchstone Theatre, Vancouver, Canada
Directed by Katrina Dunn
Premiere: Chutzpah! Festival, March 2013
Norman Rothstein Theatre, Vancouver, Canada

 String Quartet No 6 (2012) (ca. 16')
Commissioned by Sapphire String Quartet
Premiere: November 2012, Henry Crown Symphony Hall, Jerusalem, Israel
Sapphire String Quartet (Janna Gandelman – violin; Roman. Spitzer – violin; Amos Boasson – viola; Oleg Stolpner – cello)

 Arabic Violin Bass Piano Trio (2012) for Arabic violin, double bass and piano, Parts 1–3 (ca. 25')
Commissioned by IBA, Between The Lines and Challenge Records International
Premiere: November 2012
Yedid Ensemble: (Sami Hashibun – violin (Arabic tuning); Ora Boasson-Horev – double bass; Yitzhak Yedid – piano)

 The Crying Souls: Lament for Syrian Victims (2013) for 6-part a cappella choir (ca. 9')
Commissioned by The Australian Voices
Premiere: August 2013 at the Lutheran Church of the Redeemer, Jerusalem
The Australian Voices

 Psalm 1 (2014) for solo soprano (ca. 6')
Supported by the Australia Council for the Arts

 Delusions of War (2014) for 22 string soloists or a string orchestra (ca. 24') 
Commissioned by Divertimenti and the Jerusalem Symphony Orchestra
Supported by the Australia Council for the Arts 
World premiere: October 2014 at the Queensland Conservatorium Griffith University, Brisbane, Australia

 Violin (Arabic Violin) Concerto (2015) for violin and a large orchestra (ca. 25') 
Commissioned by the Israeli Music Festival

Divertimenti
Israeli premiere: February 2015 at the Henry Crown Symphony Hall
Jerusalem Symphony Orchestra conducted by Yuval Zorn
Broadcast live on Israel Broadcasting Authority's (IBA) Kol Ha'Musika station

 Zikaron (2013–14), a structured improvisation for piano solo (ca. 55') 
Commissioned by Kawai Piano Series 
Premiere: April 2015, Kawai Piano Series, Ian Hanger Recital Hall, Queensland Conservatorium Griffith University 
Yitzhak Yedid, piano

 Piano Concerto for Michael Kieran Harvey (2016) for piano and symphony orchestra (ca. 20') 
Commissioned by the Tel Aviv Soloists and Australian pianist Michael Kieran Harvey
World premiere: 6 October 2016, Ian Hanger Recital Hall, Queensland Conservatorium Griffith University, Brisbane, Australia
Divertimenti conducted by Graeme Jennings
Israeli premiere: 20 May 2017, Tel Aviv, Israel
Michael Kieran Harvey, piano; Tel Aviv Soloists

 Angels' Revolt (2016) (ca. 10') 
Commissioned by the Lev Vlassenko Piano Competition, Queensland, Australia
 Compolsery work at the Lev Vlassenko Piano Competition  
Premiere: September 2017

Premiere: 20 July 2017, Darmstadt International Summer Courses for New Music, by Graeme Jennings

 Chad Gadya (2017, for clarinet violin, cello and piano (ca. 12') 
Commissioned by Stradbroke Chamber Music Festival

Premiere: 30 July 2017, Stradbroke Chamber Music Festival Concert 6, Dunwich Public Hall, Dunwich, North Stradbroke Island, Australia
William Stafford, clarinet; Rachel Smith, violin; Louise King, cello; Ayesha Gough, piano

 Kidoshim & Killolim (2017), for chamber orchestra 
Commissioned by Swedish trombonist Christian Lindberg and the Israel Netanya Kibbutz Orchestra

Premiere: NK Orchestra in October & November 2017

 Music for Ancient Rituals (2018, for 13 wind instruments (ca. 10') 
Commissioned by ANAM

Premiere: 12 September 2018, South Melbourne Town Hall Melbourne, Australia
Eliza Shephard, Flute/Piccolo; Wally Hase, Flute; Nick Deutsch, Oboe; Owen Jackson, Oboe; Dimitri Ashkenazy, Clarinet; Mitchell Jones, Clarinet; Lyndon Watts, Bassoon; Carol Wang, Bassoon; Matthew Ventura, Contrabassoon; Marie Luise Neunecker, Horn; William Tanner, Horn; Freya Hombergen, Horn; Maraika Smit, Horn; Fabian Rusell, Conductor

 MAQA VIOLIN (2018, for violin solo (ca. 16') 
Commissioned by Graeme Jennings and Karen Bentley Pollick.

Publications
 2001: Analysis of "Tachanun" (2001) WMG, Austria
 2002: Myth and Music, Allegory of the Cave, CD Liner notes, Vienna New Music Festival Booklet and
 2003: Analysis of "Passions & Prayers, Sextet in Homage to Jerusalem" CD Liner notes and Israel Festival program.
 2004: Analysis of "Reflections Upon Six Images" IBA channel
 2005: "Psalms", Ethiopian tradition Kessim Liturgy Liner notes. Confederation House Program.
 2005: Analysis of "Oud-Bass-Piano Trio" IBA channel, Israel
 2006: Analysis of "Since my soul Loved"  Israel Broadcasting Authority (IBA), Israel
 2007: Oud Bass Piano Trio – New music incorporating a spectrum of contemporary and ancient styles. Sibiu Festival booklet (Romania), Vienna Festival booklet (Austria), International Oud Festival booklet.
 2008: Analysis of "Out to Infinity"

Discography
 1999 Full Moon Fantasy
 2001 Inner Outcry
 2002 Ras Deshen
 2003 Myth of the Cave
 2005 Passions & Prayers, Sextet in Homage to Jerusalem
 2006 Reflections upon Six Images
 2008 Oud Bass Piano Trio
2009 Since My Soul Loved 
2010 Through the Window of Marc Chagall
2012 Arabic Violin Bass Piano Trio
 2014 Visions, Fantasies and Dances: Music for String Quartet Sapphire String Quartet
2019 Angels' Revolt

Live radio broadcasts
 2001: Chamber Music Festival, Galile. Recording to television of "Tachanun"
 2003: Tel Aviv Festival. Recording to television of "Ras Deshen"
 2004: IBA, Israel. Live recording concert of "Reflections Upon Six Images"
 2005: Sibiu, Romania. Live recording concert for Radio and Television of "Oud-Bass-Piano Trio"
 2006: Vilnius Radio, Lithuania. Live recording concert for Radio and Television of "Myth of the Cave"
 2007: IBA, Israel. Live recording concert of "Nine Images for Violin Cello & Piano"
 2008: IBA, Israel. Live recording concert of "Visions, Fantasies & Dances" & "Myth of the Cave"

See also
Israeli music

References

External links
 Official site
 YouTube channel
 Australian Music Center
 Music Teachers Online
 Drouat, John (2008), "Yitzhak Yedid, Oud Bass Piano Trio, Between the Lines", Downbeat, October 2008, p. 76 (.pdf)
 Caemmerer, Arjun von. (2013), "Where Angels Fear to Tread" in Australian Jazz Magazine, 27 October 2013
 McBeath, John (2013), "Yitzhak Yedid - Suite in Four Movements", Jazz and Beyond, 2013 Archives (Published in The Australian, June 2013)
 Caemmerer, Arjun von (2014), "Singing the Baqashot – reflections on Yitzak Yedid's Visions, Fantasies and Dances" in Australian Jazz Magazine, 23 December 2014
 Mitchell, Roger, "And the Winners Are ...", in Ausjazz, 26 April 2013
 "Yitzhak Yedid wins a Sidney Myer Creative Fellowship"

1971 births
Living people
Israeli Sephardi Jews
Israeli composers
Israeli pianists
Israeli people of Syrian-Jewish descent
People from Jerusalem
New England Conservatory alumni
Israeli emigrants to Australia
Jewish Australian musicians
Challenge Records (1994) artists